Eendracht or Eendragt ("Unity") was a First Charter (i.e. first rate) two-decker ship of the confederal navy of the United Provinces (a precursor state of the Netherlands) between 1666 and 1689. Eendragt was the more common spelling in the 17th century; Eendracht is the modern Dutch standard spelling.

Eeendracht was built from 1665 to 1666 for the Maas Admiralty, one of the five naval forces of the Dutch Republic, as a replacement for the earlier ship of the same name that had been sunk in June 1665 at the Battle of Lowestoft. The new ship was the flagship of Lieutenant-Admiraal Aert van Nes at the Four Days' Battle of 1666 and at the subsequent St James' Day Battle.

References
 James Bender, Dutch Warships in the Age of Sail 1600–1714: Design, Construction, Careers and Fates. Seaforth Publishing, Barnsley, 2014. .
 J. C. De Jonge, Geschiedenis van het Nederlandsche Zeewegen, Vol.1, Haarlem, 1858.
 A. Vreugdenhil, Ships of the United Netherlands, 1648–1702. Society for Nautical Research, London, 1938.

Ships of the line of the Dutch Republic
1660s ships